Industrial engineering group may refer to:

 Industry, a segment of the economy
 Industrial Revolution, the development of industry in the 19th century
 Industrial society, one that has undergone industrialization

See also
 Industrial group (disambiguation)